The annual Bodmin Riding custom was held at Bodmin in Cornwall, England, UK, on the Sunday and Monday after 7 July (St Thomas Becket's Day). Accounts over its long history vary, but it involved a horseback procession around the town, carrying two large garlands, and probably originated as a Guild Riding custom. The earliest documentary evidence of the custom is in the Bodmin Parish Church rebuilding accounts of 1469-72, and it ceased in the early 19th century, but was revived in 1974 and now forms part of Bodmin Riding and Heritage Day Festival.

Bodmin Riding may also refer to the folk song (also known as St Ives Well Procession) still played at the Riding.

Charles II 
In July 1646, during the Wars of the Three Kingdoms, the Duke of Cornwall, the future Charles II, visited Bodmin on his way to the Isles of Scilly from whence he would go into exile. Whilst in Bodmin he joined in with the celebrations, described as sports and pastimes, and became a Brother of the Society.

Helliers

2019 Helliers 
 David Anthony
 Dan Coad
 Tom Coleman
 Merran Coleman
 Jordan Collins
 George Featherston
 Harry Featherston
 Tom Kenyon
 Jacob Price
 Tom Price
 Rikky Sweet
 Kyle Sykes
 Benjamin Watts

References

External links

Official website

Cornish culture
Festivals in Cornwall
July events
Bodmin